Allan Preston (born 16 August 1969) is a retired Scottish professional footballer and manager. He is currently a radio sports pundit for BBC Scotland.

Playing career 
Preston, who predominantly played at left-back, began his career as a 15-year-old with Dundee United in 1985. He made his league debut in the 1987/88 season. After spending several years at Tannadice, he signed for Hearts, the team he supported as a boy. After brief spells with Hearts and Dunfermline Athletic he joined St Johnstone in 1994. It was in Perth that he played the most consistent football of his career.

Management and coaching
In June 2000, after a hip injury ended his playing career, Preston became assistant to Macclesfield Town manager Peter Davenport, whom he had played with at St Johnstone. Preston left Macclesfield within a year to return to Scotland with Livingston as a coach, and in June 2004 he became the club's manager. He brought in another former St Johnstone teammate, Alan Kernaghan, as his assistant, Kernagahan had been player/manager at Clyde. In November 2004, after just fifteen games in charge, Preston and Kernaghan were sacked after the team's seventh successive defeat. 

Preston was unsuccessful in his application to be St Johnstone manager in April 2005.

Other professional interests
Preston works as a football agent for ICM Stellar Sports.

Preston has been a pundit on BBC Radio Scotland's Sportsound since 2008 and is nicknamed Biscuits.

References

External links 

1969 births
Living people
People from Leith
Scottish footballers
Association football defenders
Association football midfielders
Dundee United F.C. players
Heart of Midlothian F.C. players
Dunfermline Athletic F.C. players
St Johnstone F.C. players
Queen of the South F.C. players
Scottish Premier League players
Scottish Football League players
Scottish football managers
Livingston F.C. managers
Livingston F.C. non-playing staff
Scottish Premier League managers
Footballers from Edinburgh
Association football agents
Scottish radio personalities